The Jung Carriage Factory is a historic two-story building in Sheboygan, Wisconsin. It was built in 1885 for Jacob Jung, and designed in the Richardsonian Romanesque style. The building was initially a factory of "horsedrawn carriages, wagons, and sleighs." It has been listed on the National Register of Historic Places since July 10, 1974.

References

1885 establishments in Wisconsin
Commercial buildings completed in 1885
National Register of Historic Places in Sheboygan County, Wisconsin